Héctor Horacio Giménez Silvera (born 29 April 1975) is a former Uruguayan - Mexican football striker who last played for Estudiantes de Altamira in the Liga de Ascenso.

External links
 
 Profile & career
 
 

1975 births
Living people
Uruguayan footballers
Naturalized citizens of Mexico
Association football forwards
Querétaro F.C. footballers
Dorados de Sinaloa footballers
San Luis F.C. players
Club Necaxa footballers
Indios de Ciudad Juárez footballers
Correcaminos UAT footballers
Club León footballers
Liga MX players
Uruguayan expatriate footballers
Expatriate footballers in Mexico
Footballers from Montevideo
Atlético Mexiquense footballers